Breakin' Out is a 1987 studio album by the pianist George Shearing, accompanied by Ray Brown and Marvin "Smitty" Smith.

Track listing 
 "Just Squeeze Me (But Please Don't Tease Me)" (Duke Ellington, Lee Gaines) – 5:57
 "Day Dream" (Ellington, John La Touche) – 4:24
 "Hallucinations" (Bud Powell) – 3:54
 "In the Wee Small Hours of the Morning" (Bob Hilliard, David Mann) – 6:00
 "What'll I Do" (Irving Berlin) – 4:12
 "Break Out the Blues" (George Shearing) – 4:48
 "Don't Get Around Much Anymore" (Ellington, Bob Russell) – 5:57
 "Isn't This a Lovely Day?" (Berlin) – 3:17
 "Twelve Tone Blues" (Leonard Feather) – 3:38
 "Prelude to a Kiss" (Ellington, Mack Gordon, Irving Mills) – 6:24
 "There Is No Greater Love" (Isham Jones, Marty Symes) – 5:32

Personnel

Performance 
 George Shearing – piano
 Ray Brown - double bass
 Marvin "Smitty" Smith - drums

References 

1987 albums
George Shearing albums
Albums produced by Carl Jefferson
Concord Records albums